Sammakka Saralamma Jatara (also Sammakka Sarakka Jatara and Medaram Jatara) is a festival to honour the Hindu Tribal goddesses, celebrated in the state of Telangana, India. This Jatara is known for witnessing one of the largest people gatherings in the world. People offer Bangaram (jaggery) :The Jatara begins at Medaram in Tadvai Mandala in Mulugu district. The rituals related to the Goddesses are entirely conducted by the Koya Tribe priests, in accordance with Koya customs and traditions.

Until 1955, about 2,000 people used to visit Medaram, of which the majority 1,500 belonging to the Koya tribe.But now a large number of non-Koya people(1.3 crore) visits Medaram and the Koya people comprises only 2% of the total worshippers.

Medaram is a remote place in the Eturnagaram Wildlife Sanctuary, a part of Dandakaranya, the largest surviving forest belt in the Deccan.

Once declared a national festival, the jatara can be considered for 'intangible cultural heritage of humanity' tag of UNESCO. Jatara celebrated during the time the goddesses (Sammakka and Saralamma) of the tribals are believed to visit them. It is believed that after Kumbha Mela, the Sammakka Saralamma Jatara attracts the largest number of devotes in the country.

History
It commemorates the fight of a mother and daughter," Sammakka and Saralamma" (also known as Sarakka), with the reigning rulers against an unjustice law(rule).

There are many legends about the miraculous powers of Sammakka. According to a 13th-century tribal legend, some tribal leaders on a hunt found a newborn girl (Sammakka) enveloped in light playing amidst tigers. They took her to the tribal chief, who adopted and raised her as a leader. She later became the savior of the tribals of the region. She was married to Pagididda Raju, the tribal chief of the Koyas. The Kakatiyas (who ruled the region with its headquarters in Warangal City between 1000 AD and 1323 AD). Sammakka had two daughters and one son, Sarakka, Nagulamma, and Jampanna. King Prataprudra of the Kakatiyas imposed taxes on the Koya Tribe, which they could not pay. As a result, King Prataprudra declared war on the Koya Tribe. Pagididda Raju was killed in the ensuing battle forcing the grief-ridden Sammakka to pick up the fight with her daughter Saralamma, her son Jampanna and her son-in-law Govinda Raju. Sammakka had almost won when Saralamma died in the battle. Jampanna was mortally wounded and fell bleeding into Sampangi vaagu (stream). Legend has it that the stream turned red from the blood, and the vaagu was renamed "Jampanna Vaagu" in honor of Jampanna's sacrifice. Distraught, Sammakka retired to a hill called Chilakala Gutta and turned into a vermilion jar (Kumkum Bharani). To this day, the Koya tribe and devotees believe that Sammakka and Saralamma are manifestations of Adi Parashakti sent to protect them. 

The jatara is a celebration to honor this sacrifice. The vermilion jar is brought to Medaram and washed in Jampanna Vaagu, followed by an offering of Jaggery to Sammakka and Saralamma.

Ritual

This Jatara is held Biannually i.e once in two years for four days starts by arrival of the goddesses to Gaddelu in Medaram and ends by their vanapravēsham (entry into the forest)

Day 1 :- Māgha Shuddha Pōōrnami (Wednesday) 

Sarakka's idol is carried from Kannepalli to Medaram. 
Pagididda Raju's idol is carried from Poonugondla to Medaram

Day 2 :- Thursday

Sammakka's idol and the Kumkum casket is carried to Medaram (usually by midnight) after long secret pujas by the Koya tribes on Chilakalagutta (the hill where the Kumkum casket is kept.)
Govinda Raju's idol is carried from Kondai to Medaram.

Day 3 :- Friday (peak day of the Jatara) (believed to be the day, Adi Parashakti is worshipped)

Sammakka and Sarakka along with their consorts Pagididda Raju and Govinda Raju respectively, are worshipped. Devotees take bath in Jampanna Vaagum and offer and weigh themselves with jaggery before offering it to Sammakka and Sarakka. 

Day 4 :- Saturday

The Jatara ends with the "Tallula Vanapravēsham" (entry into the forest). The Kumkum casket is carried back to Chilakalagutta and kept there until the next Jatara.

Sammakka Sarakka Jatara is a tribal Hindu festival, held at about 100km from Warangal city. It is the time for the largest tribal congregation in the world, held every two years (biennial), with approximately ten million people converging on the place, over a period of four days. Many devotees from different states of India (Andhra Pradesh, Telangana, Madhya Pradesh, Chhattisgarh, Odisha, Maharashtra, Karnataka and parts of Jharkhand) reach to the festive place to celebrate the Jatara.

People offer bellam (jaggery) to their weight to the goddesses and take a holy bath in Jampanna Vagu (stream).

In 2008, nearly 8 million people were estimated to have attended the festival. And in 2012, the gatherings in the jatara are roughly estimated to be 10 million. This fair is said to be the largest repeating congregation of tribal communities in the world. It is also one of the largest Hindu gatherings in the world.

This Festival held in 2016 is the first one after the formation of Telangana state, and it took a greater significance with special attention by the government.

Jampanna Vagu
Jampanna Vagu, originally known as "Sampangi Vagu" is a tributary to the river Godavari. According to history, Jampanna was a tribal warrior and the son of tribal goddess Sammakka. The Jampanna Vagu took his name as he died in a battle fighting against the Kakatiyan Army in that stream. Tribals believe that taking a holy dip in the  water of Jampanna Vagu honours and reminds them of the sacrifice of their gods who saved them and also induces courage in their souls.
There is a bridge constructed on top of Jampanna Vagu, known as the Jampanna Vagu Bridge.

Transport
The Jatara venue is situated at about 100 km from Warangal, 170 km from Karimnagar, 190 km from Suryapet, 250 km from Hyderabad and 320 km from Rajahmundry (via Bhadrachalam & Manuguru).

Until 1978, the only way to reach Medaram was by a bullock cart. In 1978 then the Andhra Pradesh State Government declared the 1000-yr old festival as official and laid down a paved road. TSRTC runs multiple buses to the venue during the Jatara period. Also, many private vehicles render their services for plying the visitors and aerial view services (such as using a helicopter) are also provided during this festival.

The Jatara is very well facilitated with roads, drinking water, sanitation, health and hygiene by the Government of Telangana.

References

Festivals in Telangana
Fairs in India
Hanamkonda district
Tourist attractions in Warangal